Ctenophorus spinodomus, commonly known as the Eastern Mallee dragon is a species of agamid lizard occurring in New South Wales and South Australia.

References

Agamid lizards of Australia
spinodomus
Endemic fauna of Australia
Reptiles described in 2019
Taxa named by Ross Allen Sadlier
Taxa named by Donald J. Colgan
Taxa named by Harold Cogger